Bebi Airport  is an airport serving Bebi in the Cross River State of Nigeria. It also serves as the airport for the Obudu Mountain Resort.

See also

Transport in Nigeria
List of airports in Nigeria

References

External links
SkyVector - Bebi Airstrip

Airports in Nigeria